Shiner is a surname. Notable people with the surname include:

David Shiner (disambiguation), multiple people
Dick Shiner (born 1942), American football player
Esther Shiner (1924–1987), Canadian politician
Lewis Shiner (born 1950), American writer
Margot Shiner (1923–1998), German-British gastroenterologist and medical researcher
Michael Shiner (1805–1880), American slave and diarist
Phil Shiner (born 1956), British former lawyer
Ronald Shiner (1903–1966), British stand-up comedian and comedic actor
Roy Shiner (1924–1988), English footballer

See also 
Scheiner